Paulet St John-Mildmay (8 April 1791 – 19 May 1845) was an English Liberal Party politician. He sat in the House of Commons as a Member of Parliament (MP) for Winchester from 1818 to 1835, and from 1837 to 1841.

He was the third son of the fifteen children of Sir Henry St John-Mildmay, 3rd Baronet of Dogmersfield Park, Hampshire and his Jane, daughter and coheir of Carew Mildmay of Shawford House, Hampshire.

He was educated at Winchester School from 1803–05. In 1813, he married Anna Maria Wyndham, daughter of Hon. Bartholomew Bouverie.  They had 4 sons and 3 daughters.  In 1808, he succeeded to his father's property of Hazlegrove House, near Sparkford in Somerset.

He served as an ensign in the 2nd Foot Guards from 1807, and then as a lieutenant and captain from 1811–12.  In 1813 he became a lieutenant in the Dogmersfield yeoman cavalry.

At the 1818 general election he was returned as MP for Winchester, on the interest controlled by his mother. The seat had previously been held by his father, and by his brother Sir Henry St John-Mildmay, 4th Baronet.

References

External links 
 

1791 births
1845 deaths
UK MPs 1831–1832
UK MPs 1832–1835
UK MPs 1837–1841
Liberal Party (UK) MPs for English constituencies
Whig (British political party) MPs for English constituencies
Younger sons of baronets